Zahoor Khan (born 25 May 1989) is a Pakistani-born cricketer who plays for the United Arab Emirates national cricket team.

International career
He made his Twenty20 International (T20I) debut for the United Arab Emirates against Afghanistan in the 2017 Desert T20 Challenge on 16 January 2017. He made his One Day International (ODI) debut for the United Arab Emirates against Scotland on 24 January 2017. On 2 March 2017, he took 6 wickets for 34 runs against Ireland, which was the best figures by an Emirati bowler in an ODI.

In January 2018, he was named in the United Arab Emirates' squad for the 2018 ICC World Cricket League Division Two tournament. In August 2018, he was named in the United Arab Emirates' squad for the 2018 Asia Cup Qualifier tournament. In December 2018, he was named in the United Arab Emirates' team for the 2018 ACC Emerging Teams Asia Cup.

In June 2019, he was selected to play for the Brampton Wolves franchise team in the 2019 Global T20 Canada tournament. In September 2019, he was named in the United Arab Emirates' squad for the 2019 ICC T20 World Cup Qualifier tournament in the UAE. In December 2020, he was one of ten cricketers to be awarded with a year-long full-time contract by the Emirates Cricket Board.

References

External links
 

1989 births
Living people
Emirati cricketers
United Arab Emirates One Day International cricketers
United Arab Emirates Twenty20 International cricketers
Cricketers from Faisalabad
Faisalabad cricketers
Faisalabad Wolves cricketers
Pakistan Television cricketers
Pakistani cricketers
Pakistani emigrants to the United Arab Emirates
Pakistani expatriate sportspeople in the United Arab Emirates